Ints Dālderis (born 10 February 1971, Jūrmala, Latvian SSR) is a Latvian clarinetist and politician of initially the People's Party, then New Era Party, then Unity and finally Movement For!. He was Minister of Culture of Latvia from March 12, 2009 to November 3, 2010.

References

1971 births
Living people
People from Jūrmala
People's Party (Latvia) politicians
New Era Party politicians
New Unity politicians
Movement For! politicians
Ministers of Culture of Latvia
Deputies of the 10th Saeima
Deputies of the 12th Saeima
Latvian musicians
Recipients of the Order of the Cross of Terra Mariana, 1st Class